Thillaiyampalam Sivanesan (16 October 1963 – 18 May 2009), also known by his nom de guerre, Soosai, was the head of the Sea Tigers, the naval wing of the Liberation Tigers of Tamil Eelam.

Personal life 

Thillaiyampalam Sivanesan was married to Sathyadevi and they had two children called Suresh and Madhi. The Sri Lankan Navy stated that Soosai's wife and children were in custody after they were intercepted at sea by the SL Navy whilst attempting to flee to India during the war.

Further reading

See also 
Liberation Tigers of Tamil Eelam
Sea Tigers

References 

 

1963 births
2009 deaths
Liberation Tigers of Tamil Eelam members
Sri Lankan Tamil rebels
Sri Lankan rebels
People from Jaffna District